Jasset David Cody Ormsby-Gore, 7th Baron Harlech (born 1 July 1986), is a British hereditary peer and Conservative member of the House of Lords. He has been serving as a Lord in Waiting since September 2022.

Personal life
Harlech is a great-great-great-grandson of Robert Gascoyne-Cecil, 3rd Marquess of Salisbury, who served as British prime minister. His father was Francis Ormsby-Gore, 6th Baron Harlech, a Conservative peer, and his mother was Amanda Ormsby-Gore (née Grieve), a creative consultant and writer. Due to his father's mental health issues, he describes his mother raising him and his sister "essentially as a single parent".

Harlech was educated at Eton College. He studied graphic design at Central Saint Martins art school, graduating with a Bachelor of Arts (BA) degree in 2008.

House of Lords
Harlech sought election as a Liberal Democrat peer in 2017 "in order to stand for equality and progress".

Harlech became a member of the House in July 2021, being elected in a hereditary peers' by-election by the whole House. He took the oath on 22 July 2021. He made his maiden speech on 28 October 2021 during a debate on the Land Use Framework; talking about his father, being an army reservist, his life before joining the Lords and his love of the countryside.

, he is the youngest member of the House of Lords.

Titles 
 1 July 1986 – 1 February 2016: The Honourable Jasset David Cody Ormsby-Gore
 1 February 2016 – present: The Right Honourable The Lord Harlech

References

External link

1986 births
Living people
People from Gwynedd
British people of Irish descent
British people of Scottish descent
Gore family (Anglo-Irish aristocracy)
7
People educated at Eton College
Alumni of Central Saint Martins
Conservative Party (UK) hereditary peers
Welsh landowners
Hereditary peers elected under the House of Lords Act 1999